Gustavis A. Willard was a member of the Wisconsin State Assembly.

Biography
Willard was born in January 1840 in Maine. He was married to Patience Willard and would have eight children. Willard died in Sheboygan, Wisconsin in 1925 and was buried there.

Career
Willard was a member of the Assembly during the 1878 session. Willard was a Democrat.

References

External links
The Political Graveyard

Maine Democrats
Politicians from Sheboygan, Wisconsin
Members of the Wisconsin State Assembly
Wisconsin Democrats
1840 births
1925 deaths
Burials in Wisconsin